Fahad Khalfan may refer to:

 Fahad Khalfan (Emirati footballer)
 Fahad Khalfan (Qatari footballer)